The Scoundrel is a 1931 German comedy film directed by Eugen Schüfftan and Franz Wenzler and starring Max Adalbert, Emilia Unda, and Evelyn Holt. It is based on the play The Scoundrel by Hans Reimann and Toni Impekoven. It was shot at the Babelsberg Studios in Berlin with sets designed by the art directors Hans Sohnle and Otto Erdmann. The film was remade in 1939 and 1959.

Cast

References

Bibliography

External links 
 

1931 films
Films of the Weimar Republic
German comedy films
1931 comedy films
1930s German-language films
German films based on plays
Films directed by Eugen Schüfftan
Films directed by Franz Wenzler
Films set in Berlin
German black-and-white films
UFA GmbH films
1930s German films
Films shot at Babelsberg Studios